The Asian Cup Winners' Cup  was an association football competition run by the Asian Football Confederation (AFC). The competition was started in 1991 as a tournament for all the domestic cup winners from countries affiliated to the AFC. The winners of the Cup Winners' Cup used to contest the Asian Super Cup against the winners of the Asian Club Championship. The most successful clubs in the competition are Al Hilal from Saudi Arabia and Nissan FC from Japan.

Finals

Records and statistics

The following table lists countries by number of winners and runner-up in Asian Cup Winners' Cup.

By nation

By club 
The following table lists clubs by number of times winners and runners-up in Asian Cup Winners' Cup.

1 including Nissan FC.  
2 Yokohama Flügels was merged with Yokohama Marinos to Yokohama F. Marinos in 1999.

Winning coaches
The following table lists the winning coaches of the Asian Cup Winners' Cup.

External links
 Asian Cup Winners Cup – RSSSF

 
Defunct Asian Football Confederation club competitions
Recurring sporting events established in 1990
Recurring sporting events disestablished in 2002